"Everytime We Touch" is a song jointly written and composed, then recorded, by Scottish singer Maggie Reilly for her 1992 album, Echoes. Reilly collaborated with Stuart Mackillop and Peter Risavy to write the lyrics of, and compose the music for, the song, which Armand Volker produced and which was recorded on the Mambo Musik Records label. It was a major hit in Europe in the 1990s, reaching #1 chart position in Norway, a position it held for 8 consecutive weeks.

Critical reception
Roch Parisien from AllMusic described the song as "a dreamy, memorable love song" in his review of Echoes.

Formats and track listings
CD single (Electrola | 1 C 560-2 04667 2)
"Everytime We Touch" (Radio Mix) – 3:59
"Gaia" – 2:41
"Everytime We Touch" (Long Version) – 7:18
"Everytime We Touch" (Rhythm Mix) – 4:21
7" single
"Everytime We Touch" – 3:59
"Gaia" – 2:41
12" single
"Everytime We Touch" (Long Version) – 7:18
"Everytime We Touch" – 3:59
"Everytime We Touch" (Rhythm Mix) – 4:21

Cassette single
"Everytime We Touch" – 3:59
"Gaia" – 2:41

Charts

Weekly charts

Year-end charts

Cover versions
"Everytime We Touch" has been covered by a few artists, including Trixiana, Lacara and Trinity.

A Swedish version, with lyrics by Keith Almgren, called "Varje gång du ler" (eng. "Everytime You Smile") has been recorded by Septembers 1994 and later by Cosmos (1997 on the album Jag har en dröm).
In 2005, the song's chorus was borrowed, with permission from Reilly, for a Eurodance version also called "Everytime We Touch", performed by dance group Cascada. This cover version was a major hit in the U.S., peaking in the top 10 on the pop chart. Although the new version has completely different verses, the writing credit still appears the same as it appeared on the original recording by Maggie Reilly.
The Croatian song "Sedam Dana" by a band named Karma also uses the same basic melody.
The Techno/Dance group Cash Cash also created a version of this song using the lyrics from Cascada.

References

External links
The album Echoes on discogs.com

1992 singles
Number-one singles in Norway
Maggie Reilly songs
1992 songs
EMI Records singles
Electrola singles